Alex Veley is an American rock musician, soul keyboardist and singer.

Biography
He was a founding member of Seattle-based neo-soul band Maktub in the 1990s with lead singer Reggie Watts and co-produced the band's debut album, 2000's Subtle Ways which won "Best R&B album" that year at the Northwest Music Awards. He later went on to tour and perform with other Seattle groups like Tuatara, The Minus 5, and record with solo artists like Arkansas Delta Blues guitarist CeDell Davis and singer-songwriter Dave Matthews, playing Hammond organ on Matthews' grammy-award-winning solo album, "Some Devil."

In 2003, he moved to Rio de Janeiro, Brazil, where he currently records and performs with artists such as Nando Reis (as part of his band Os Infernais), Erasmo Carlos, and many others.

Veley released a jazz-funk solo album in 2003 entitled Maconha Baiana, recorded both in Rio de Janeiro and Seattle, Washington. He is known for using classic keyboards like the Hammond organ, Fender Rhodes electric piano, and Hohner Clavinet.

Discography

United States
1996:  Sharkskin  "Kiran's Dance"  (Sweet Mother Recordings) 
1997:  Source of Labor  Word Sound Power  (Jasiri Media Group)
1997:  Source of Labor  "Overstandings"  (Jasiri Media Group)
1999:  Maktub  Subtle Ways  (Jasiri Media Group)
2001:  Source of Labor  Stolen Lives  (Sub Verse Music)
2001:  Wayward Shamans  Alchemy  (Fast Horse Recordings)
2002:  Tuatara  Cinemathique  (Fast Horse Recordings)
2002:  CeDell Davis  When Lightnin' Hit the Pine  (Fast Horse Recordings)
2003:  Dave Matthews  Some Devil  (RCA)
2003:  Jude Bowerman Life Goes On (Yellow Tone)
2003:  Mackrosoft  1st Mack To The Moon  (Mackrosoft Records)
2003:  Mackrosoft  Journey To Vaginus  (Mackrosoft Records)
2003:  Mackrosoft  Life Imitates Clouds  (Mackrosoft Records)
2005:  Bola Abimbola  Ara Kenge  (Fast Horse Recordings)
2005:  Mackrosoft  The Dawning Of The Aja Aquarius  (Mackrosoft Records)
2005:  Aja West & Cheeba  Flash & Snowball  (Mackrosoft Records)
2006:  Mackrosoft  Antonio's Giraffe  (Mackrosoft Records)
2011:  Veley Brothers  "The Way You Make Me Smile"
2016:  CeDell Davis  Even The Devil Gets The Blues  (Sunyata Records)

Brazil
2000:  Nando Reis  Para Quando o Arco-Íris Encontrar o Pote de Ouro  (Warner)
2001:  Nando Reis  Infernal  (Warner)
2001:  Nando Reis  Dê Uma Chance Á Paz, John Lennon, Uma Homenagem  - "Mind Games"  (Geléia Geral)
2003:  Nando Reis  A Letra A  (Universal)
2003:  Mylene  _mylene  (Fast Horse Recordings)
2003:  Nando Reis Assim Assado - Tributo ao Secos e Molhados - "Sangue Latino" (Deckdisc)
2005:  Nando Reis Um Barzinho, Um Violão - Jovem Guarda - "Você Pediu e Eu Já Vou Daqui" (Universal)
2005:  Nando Reis e os Infernais  MTV Ao Vivo – Nando Reis e Os Infernais  (MTV – Universal)
2006:  Pepê Barcellos  Chega De Falar De Amor
2006:  O Salto  A Noite É Dos Que Não Dormem
2006:  Nando Reis e os Infernais  Sim e Não  (Universal)
2007:  Nando Reis e os Infernais  Luau MTV – Nando Reis e Os Infernais  (MTV – Universal)
2007:  George Israel  Distorções do Meu Jardim  (Som Livre)
2007:  Sérgio Loroza  MPB - Música Brasileira de Pista  (Zambo Discos)
2009:  Nando Reis e os Infernais  Drês  (Universal)
2009:  Erasmo Carlos  Rock 'n' Roll  (Coqueiro Verde)
2009:  Nando Reis  "Eu Nasci Há Dez Mil Anos Atrás"  Caminho das Índias  - soundtrack  
2010:  Nando Reis e os Infernais  Bailão do Ruivão  (MTV – Universal)
2010:  Nando Reis e os Infernais  Soberano - Seis Vezes São Paulo  - original soundtrack
2010:  Ana Cañas  Hein?  - bonus track: "Luz Antiga"  (Sony)
2010:  Zafenate  Zafenate  (Universal)
2010:  Carlos Pontual  Inventa Qualquer Coisa
2010:  Kid Abelha  "Veio do Tempo"  - unreleased studio version
2011:  Erasmo Carlos  Sexo  (Coqueiro Verde)
2011:  Cássia Eller  Relicário  (Universal)
2012:  Nando Reis e os Infernais  Sei
2013:  TAI  Seda e Pedra
2013:  Dois Reis  "Família"  Malhação Casa Cheia  - soundtrack
2013:  Nando Reis e os Infernais  Sei Como Foi em BH  (Coqueiro Verde)
2013:  Mario Broder  Balanço Diferente
2013:  Alex Veley Trio  Rock 'n' Soul
2014:  Negra Li  "Negra Livre"  Você Vai Estar Na Minha: Duetos
2014:  Lucio Kropf  O Baú Musical de Lucio Kropf e os Agregados do Rock and Roll
2015:  Lucio Kropf  Pela Rua
2016:  Nando Reis  Jardim - Pomar  (Relicário)
2017:  Nando Reis  Turnê Jardim Pomar ao vivo, #1 - live album
2017:  Nando Reis  Turnê Jardim Pomar ao vivo, #2 - live album
2017:  Nando Reis  Turnê Jardim Pomar ao vivo, #3 - live album
2017:  Nando Reis  Turnê Jardim Pomar ao vivo, #4 - live album
2017:  Nando Reis  Turnê Jardim Pomar ao vivo, #5 - live album
2017:  Nando Reis  Turnê Jardim Pomar ao vivo, #6 - live album
2017:  Nando Reis  Turnê Jardim Pomar ao vivo, #7 - live album
2017:  Nando Reis  Turnê Jardim Pomar ao vivo, #8 - live album
2017:  Trinca de Asas  "Tocarte" 
2017:  McGee and the Lost Hope  "Magick Beings" (Abraxas Records)
2018:  Nando Reis  "Rock 'n' Roll"  (Relicário)
2018:  Blame The Guitar Man, featuring Alex Veley  The Human
2018:  Bellini  "Ela"  
2018:  Nando Reis Não Sou Nenhum Roberto Mas as Vezes Chego Perto  (Relicário)
2019:  Blame The Guitar Man, featuring Mario Broder  Mundo Melhor
2019:  Blame The Guitar Man, featuring Julia Cascon  Madrugada
2019:  Nando Reis  "Como Vai Você"  (Relicário)
2019:  Nando Reis & Melim  "Onde Você Mora?"  (Relicário)
2020:  Nando Reis  "Espera a Primavera"  (Relicário)
2020:  Nando Reis & Ana Vilela  "Laços"  (Musickeria)
2021:  Nando Reis & Pitty  "Um Tiro no Coração"  (Relicário)
2021:  Various Artists "Canção Pra Amazônia"  (Greenpeace)
2021:  Malouka, feat. Alex Veley  "Space Cake"  (Veley Records)
2021:  Nando Reis & Arnaldo Antunes  "Não Vou Me Adaptar"  (Relicário)
2021:  Folks  "Mentalize (Vem Coisa Boa)"  (Toca Discos)
2022:  Nando Reis & Jão  "Sim"  (Relicário)
2022:  Nando Reis & Elana Dara  "Hey, Babe!"  (Relicário / Warner)
2022:  Various Artists Cassia Reggae, vol. 1  (Universal)
2022:  PittyNando As Suas, As Minhas E As Nossas  (Deckdisc)
2022:  Nando Reis & Colomy  "Pra Você Guardei o Amor"  (Relicário)
2023:  Nando Reis & Jade Baraldo  "A Fila"  (Relicário)

Solo material
2003:  Alex Veley  Maconha Baiana

DVDs
2005:  Nando Reis e os Infernais  MTV Ao Vivo - Nando Reis e Os Infernais  (MTV - Universal)
2005:  Nando Reis  Um Barzinho, um Violão - Jovem Guarda - "Você Pediu e Eu Já Vou Daqui"   (Universal Music)
2007:  Nando Reis e os Infernais  Luau MTV - Nando Reis e Os Infernais  (MTV - Universal)
2007:  Nando Reis e Cachorro Grande Estúdio Coca-Cola - Nando Reis e Cachorro Grande (MTV - Brasil)
2010:  Nando Reis e os Infernais  Bailão do Ruivão  (MTV - Universal)
2013:  Nando Reis e os Infernais  Sei Como Foi em BH

References

Living people
American soul keyboardists
Musicians from Seattle
American expatriates in Brazil
University of Washington College of Arts and Sciences alumni
The Minus 5 members
1973 births